State Road 520 is a four-lane connector about  in length. U.S. 12 and U.S. 20 do not cross with each other — they parallel each other for another  westbound and overlap in Gary; U.S. 20 is generally considered the faster of the two, while U.S. 12 is the scenic Dunes Highway. Eastbound, U.S. 12 travels through Michigan City and northeast into Michigan where it forks east from the Red Arrow Highway. U.S. 20 stays in Indiana and runs around Michigan City as a bypass to the south.

State Road 520 is the shortest designated highway in the State of Indiana.

Route description
State Road 520 begins at a 3-way intersection with U.S. Route 20. The road is locally known as Maple Street and is an undivided four-lane road for its entire length. It heads north from this intersection and soon reaches another 3-way intersection with a local road known as Pine Street. A motel is located at the intersection across from Pine Street. SR 520 passes under a directional sign at its halfway point. The road passes by a fire station before it meets US 12 at another 3-way intersection. There are a total of eight houses on SR 520, plus a storage facility near the US 20 interchange. Several houses also have driveways on the road.

Major intersections

References

External links

520
Transportation in Porter County, Indiana
State highways in the United States shorter than one mile